The III Tour is the third headlining concert tour by American musician Banks in support of her third studio album III. The tour began on September 3, 2019 in Toronto, Canada and is set to conclude on November 21, 2019 in Paris, France.

Background
Banks announced the North America dates on June 3, 2019, marking her first tour since The Altar Tour in 2017. American musician Kevin Garrett was announced as the opening act for North America dates. The Europe dates were announced on June 7, 2019. Banks announced that American musician Finneas would open the show in Dallas along with Garrett.

Set list
This set list is from the concert on September 3, 2019 in Toronto, Canada. It is not intended to represent all tour dates.

"Till Now"
"Underdog"
"Stroke"
"Drowning"
"Waiting Game"
"Contaminated"
"Hawaiian Mazes"
"Alaska"
"Propaganda"
"Poltergeist"
"Fuck with Myself"
"Sawzall"
"Better"
"Gemini Feed"
"Godless"
"The Fall"
"Gimme"

Encore
"Look What You're Doing to Me"
"Beggin for Thread"

Tour dates

Notes

References

2019 concert tours